Abdullah Thuwaini Al-Mukhaini (born 6 November 1986), commonly known as Abdullah Al-Mukhaini, is an Omani footballer who plays for Al-Shabab Club in Oman Professional League.

Club career
On 7 July 2014, he signed a one-year contract with Al-Shabab Club.

Club career statistics

International career
Abdullah was selected for the national team for the first time in 2011. He earned his first call-up for Oman on 15 November 2011 against Saudi Arabia in the Third Round of 2014 FIFA World Cup qualification.

Honours

Club
With Sur
Sultan Qaboos Cup (1): 2007; Runners-up 2006
Omani Federation Cup (0): Runners-up 2007
Oman Super Cup (0): Runners-up 2008

With Al-Oruba
Omani League (0): Runners-up 2010–11
Sultan Qaboos Cup (1): 2010
Oman Super Cup (1): 2011

References

External links
 
 
 
 
 

1986 births
Living people
People from Sur, Oman
Omani footballers
Oman international footballers
Association football forwards
Sur SC players
Al-Orouba SC players
Suwaiq Club players
Al-Shabab SC (Seeb) players
Oman Professional League players